Katangsky District is an administrative district, one of the thirty-three in Irkutsk Oblast, Russia. Municipally, it is incorporated as Katangsky Municipal District. Its administrative center is the rural locality (a selo) of Yerbogachen. Population:  4,579 (2002 Census);  The population of Yerbogachen accounts for 52.0% of the district's total population.

See also
 Lena Plateau

References

Notes

Sources

Districts of Irkutsk Oblast